The 2020 National Lacrosse League season, formally known as the 2019–2020 season, was the 34th in the history of the NLL. The season began on November 29, 2019 and was scheduled to end with the NLL final in late spring of 2020. However due to the COVID-19 pandemic, the season was suspended on March 12, 2020. On April 8, the league made a further public statement announcing the cancellation of the remaining games of the 2020 season and that they would be exploring options for playoffs once it was safe to resume play.

This season was the inaugural season for the expansion Knighthawks and Riptide. The former Rochester Knighthawks under owner Curt Styres relocated to Halifax for this season while Pegula Sports and Entertainment took over the Knighthawks moniker with a new expansion team.

Regular season

Awards

Annual awards

References: Winners

Stadiums and locations

Attendance

See also
 2020 in sports

References

National Lacrosse League
National Lacrosse League seasons
NLL season